Antichloris is a genus of tiger moths in the family Erebidae. The genus was erected by Jacob Hübner in 1818.

Species
Antichloris affinis (Rothschild, 1912)
Antichloris caca Hübner, 1818
Antichloris clementi Schaus, 1938
Antichloris eriphia (Fabricius, 1777)
Antichloris flammea Dognin, 1891
Antichloris ornata (H. Druce, 1883)
Antichloris scudderii Butler, 1876
Antichloris viridis H. Druce, 1884

References

Euchromiina
Moth genera